First arch syndromes are congenital defects caused by a failure of neural crest cells to migrate into the first pharyngeal arch.  They can produce facial anomalies.  Examples of first arch syndromes include Treacher Collins syndrome and Pierre Robin syndrome.

References 

Congenital disorders
Syndromes
Pharyngeal arches